Aycan Yurtsever is a Turkish-Canadian physicist, currently a Canada Research Chair at Université du Québec's Institut national de recherche scientifique.

References

Year of birth missing (living people)
Living people
Canadian people of Turkish descent
Academic staff of the Université du Québec
Turkish physicists
Canadian physicists
Bilkent University alumni
California Institute of Technology alumni
Cornell University alumni